Blue Ridge is an unincorporated community in Liberty Township, Shelby County, in the U.S. state of Indiana.

History
Blue Ridge was originally called Cynthiana, and under the latter name was platted in 1835. A post office called Blue Ridge was established in 1847, and remained in operation until it was discontinued in 1907. Blue Ridge contained a school that was discontinued at an unknown date.

Geography

References

Unincorporated communities in Shelby County, Indiana
Unincorporated communities in Indiana
Indianapolis metropolitan area